The TPz Fuchs from Transportpanzer Fuchs is a German armoured personnel carrier originally developed by Daimler-Benz but manufactured and further developed by the now Rheinmetall MAN Military Vehicles (RMMV). Fuchs was the second wheeled armoured vehicle to enter service with the Bundeswehr (West German Military) and it can be used for tasks including troop transport, engineer transport, bomb disposal, Nuclear, Biological and Chemical reconnaissance and electronic warfare. RMMV and its predecessors manufactured 1,236 Fuchs 1, mostly for the German Army.

Further development of the design resulted in the Fuchs 2, first shown in 2001. The enhanced Fuchs 2 is currently in production, known customers include Algerian Army, Kuwait Army and the United Arab Emirates Army (UAE).

Development
In 1977, Rheinstahl Wehrtechnik (which in 1996 became Henschel Wehrtechnik (subsequently Rheinmetall Landsysteme and now Rheinmetall MAN Military Vehicles (RMMV), under licence from Daimler-Benz, was awarded a contract by the German Army for 996 Transportpanzer Fuchs 1. The first production vehicle was handed over in December 1979 with deliveries running at 160 per year and concluding in late 1986.

German Army designations for Fuchs 1 as delivered were:
TPz 1/Standard, 504 delivered (TPz 1 Standard could be fitted with various installation kits for different battlefield missions)
TPz 1A1/EloKa, 87 delivered (electronic warfare variant, not amphibious)
TPz 1A2/Funk, 265 delivered (command vehicle, fitted with a Mission Kit (installation kit) for various roles)
TPz 1A3/ABC or Spürpanzer Fuchs, 140 delivered (NBC reconnaissance vehicle).

For use in the former Yugoslavia, by early 1998 the German Army had upgraded 55 Fuchs 1 with additional protection.

As a further development of the Fuchs 1, two pre-production Fuchs KRK (Krisenreaktionskräfte - German: "Crisis Reaction Forces") were built in 1997, with production vehicle options for 50 units expected in 1999. The type never entered quantity production.

In 2002, the German BWB announced that it had awarded a €45 million contract to upgrade 123 Fuchs 1 APCs. The work was carried out between 2004 and 2007 at Kassel, where the vehicles were originally built. Vehicles upgraded under this contract were given the TPz A7 designation.

The latest upgraded Fuchs 1 are given the TPz A8 designation, deliveries of these first made to the German Army in March 2008. It introduced improved protection against mines and IEDs, specially for German units stationed in Afghanistan. The most recent TPz A8 upgrade award brought totals to 168 vehicles. Late in 2013, it was stated that, in the long term, the German Army planned to retain a fleet of up to 728 Fuchs 1 upgraded to TPz A8 standard.

Continued development of the Fuchs 1 resulted in the Fuchs 2, the first example of which was shown in public for the first time at the 2001 MSPO in Poland. The first order for Fuchs 2 was for Nuclear, Biological and Chemical (NBC) reconnaissance variants for the United Arab Emirates (UAE). The order was placed in 2005.

In 2014, the German Ministry of Economic Affairs and Energy confirmed that it had approved the transfer of production equipment to Algeria to enable this country to undertake production of the Fuchs 2.

Kuwait ordered a batch of Fuchs 2 in 2015. These will be manufactured in Germany.

Description
The hull of the Fuchs is constructed of all-welded armoured steel. The driver sits at the front on the left, with the vehicle commander to his right. There are doors for both driver and commander. The door windows and windscreen have metal shutters that can be closed up. When closed up, the periscopes fitted in the roof of the vehicle to the front of the driver's hatch allow visibility out of the cabin. The commander has a circular roof hatch.

Two assisted doors are fitted at the rear, although on Fuchs 2 a ramp is an option.

There are three or four hatches in the roof of the troop compartment. In APC configuration, the ten infantrymen carried by Fuchs 1 are seated on individual bucket-type seats, five on each side. These seats can be folded up when not required. Fuchs 2 seats up to nine on much-improved blast-resistant seating.

Normal amphibious payload for Fuchs 1 is  but, depending on configuration and protection options, up to 5,000 kg of cargo can be carried on land. Fuchs 2 has a maximum payload of 6000 kg.

Motive power for the Fuchs 1 is provided by a Mercedes-Benz Model OM 402A V8 12.8-litre water-cooled diesel engine developing , this coupled in a powerpack set-up to a six-speed planetary gear torque converter transmission. For the Fuchs 2 the powerpack is upgraded to a MTU 6V 199 TE20 V6 11.9-litre water-cooled EURO 3 emissions compliant diesel developing , this coupled to a ZF 6HP 602 fully automatic six-speed transmission with integrated retarder. For test purposes the power pack of the Fuchs can be run outside the vehicle.

The rigid Mercedes-Benz drive axles are of the hub-reduction type, fitted with differential locks and are sprung by progressively acting coil springs and shock-absorbers. Power-steering is on the front four wheels, the Fuchs 2 offering the option of a central tyre inflation system (CTIS). The 1400 R20 tyres are of the run-flat type.

The Fuchs was designed as an amphibious vehicle, water propulsion provided by two four-bladed propellers mounted one either side of the hull at the rear. Maximum water speed is approx. 8 km/hr. For steering, the propellers can be swivelled through 360°. Before entering the water, a trim vane, which is stowed on the glacis plate when travelling, is hydraulically erected. Bilge pumps are fitted. As part of the TPz A8 upgrade, the amphibious capability is removed, but the vehicles can wade up to 1.3 m.

The welded steel hull of the Fuchs was designed to protect the crew from armor-piercing small arms fire and shell splinters. For service with the United Nations Implementation Force (IFOR) operating in Bosnia, a higher level of protection was required and a batch of Fuchs 1 were upgraded with passive fibre compound add-on armour package developed by IBD-Deisenroth. This armour package includes an add-on armour mounted externally on the sides of the hull; internal spall liners fitted to the hull sides, rear and roof to reduce the secondary effects of particles having penetrated the main armour; additional elements in the floor area of the front and rear compartments to provide increased protection against mines; new windows with increased protection and modification of the window protective shields.

The TPz A7 upgrade included protection enhancements, as does the current TPz A8 upgrade. For the TPz A7 and A8 upgrades, additional elements protect the underside and lower part of the hull against blast and IED threats.

The baseline Fuchs 2 provides protection against small arms armour-piercing attack through a full 360°. To meet different threat levels the Fuchs 2 has been designed to be fitted with enhanced passive armour packages developed by IBD.

To enhance survivability while conducting Military Operations in Urban Terrain (MOUT), Rheinmetall has developed a modular upgrade package for installation on tracked and wheeled armoured vehicles. A MOUT demonstrator vehicle was completed in 2008, this based on the Fuchs 1.

Armament varies according to mission requirements but for Fuchs 1 can consist of a 7.62 mm Rheinmetall MG3 general-purpose machine gun mounted over the commander's position. Vehicles of the Armoured Reconnaissance Battalion, Panzergrenadiers mechanized infantry, the Franco-German Brigade, the mountain infantry and the Jägers of the German Army have previously been fitted with the MILAN anti-tank guided missile, but these are no longer in service. All vehicles have six 76 mm grenade dischargers mounted to fire forwards. Vehicles deployed to Afghanistan were equipped with a GMG grenade launcher or an M2 Browning heavy machine gun instead of an MG3.

The Fuchs 2 can be fitted with a wide range of weapon systems up to and including a 30 mm cannon and 7.62 mm MG as well as various missile installations, such as anti-tank missiles.

Standard equipment for the Fuchs 2 includes an NBC system and an air conditioning system. Numerous options available include an automatic fire detection and suppression system, winch, global positioning system and an auxiliary power unit (APU).

Operators and export sales
  980 Fuchs 2 required. In 2014 the German Ministry of Economic Affairs and Energy confirmed that it had approved the transfer of production equipment to Algeria for production of the Fuchs 2 (6 × 6) family of vehicles. The first export licence for the Fuchs 2 for Algeria was approved in 2011 followed by approval for production sets to Algeria in August 2013. In June 2014 Rheinmetall confirmed that the contract was worth €2.7 billion (US$3.7 billion) and covered the supply of 980 units. The first batch of 54 Fuchs 2 for Algeria have come from the German production line and will be followed by progressive transfer of production to Algeria, but with major subsystems such as power packs and drive lines continuing to come from Germany.
  996 Fuchs 1 delivered from 1979. 45 additional Fuchs 1 ordered in 1991. Various upgrades undertaken including 124 to TPz A7 standard and 168 to latest TPz A8 standard (728 required).
  8 Fuchs NBC were loaned from German Army stocks during the first Gulf War. These are thought to remain in use.
  11 Fuchs 1. 12 Fuchs 2 ordered in mid-2015. These will be in NBC reconnaissance configuration, and deliveries will start in 2017. The contract also covers training, service and spare parts.
  24 electronic warfare Fuchs 1 variants delivered. In 2006 12 of these were converted to an NBC role.
  8 Fuchs 1 NBC.
  36 Fuchs 1 were delivered some time ago (exact date unknown). 14 APC, 8 ambulance, 4 command post, 10 NBC.
  Two Fuchs 1 were loaned during the first Gulf War and later returned.
  32 Fuchs 2 NBC reconnaissance vehicles ordered in February 2005 under a contract valued at €160 million (US$205 million). The order comprises 16 NBC reconnaissance vehicles, eight bio vehicles and eight command post vehicles, which will provide the UAE with a complete NBC detection capability linked to a command-and-control system.
  11 Fuchs 1 NBC variants (ex-German Army) delivered in 1990. These vehicles were put into storage in 2011 but a regeneration project was launched in February 2014. Eight vehicles are used by Falcon Squadron, Royal Tank Regiment, 22 Engineer Regiment with one attrition reserve and two training vehicles. The Fuchs Regeneration and Availability Service contract secured the vehicle's service life until 2019. The UK also used a small number of electronic warfare versions during the 1991 Gulf War In October 2020, RBSL (Rheinmetall BAE Systems Land) announced a £16 million sustainment contract award for the UK MoD's Fuchs fleet and training simulator. The award will address equipment-related obsolescence issues and upgrade the system with the latest generation of sensing capabilities. The new support contract includes technical support, provision of spares and repairs, maintenance, training, and design services.
  123 (current estimate) Fuchs 1 designated M93 Fox. The General Dynamics Land Systems (GDLS) M93 Fox NBCRS (Nuclear Biological Chemical Reconnaissance System) vehicle is the US variant of the Fuchs 1 NBC reconnaissance vehicle. The requirement for an NBC reconnaissance vehicle, for use by US Forces in the European theatre, was first recognised and a three-phase program initiated in the late 1980s. The first phase of the project involved the evaluation of three vehicles types; the Fuchs (M93) being selected in July 1989. Phase II of the program, the Interim System Production (ISP) phase, resulted in the purchase of 48 vehicles. The Phase II vehicles were provided in two batches, one of eight vehicles and the other of 40. Phase II was completed in 1993. Phases III and IV would have included the US-licensed production of an additional 210 vehicles, supplementing the 48 already produced. In mid-1995, it was announced that the US Army had already received a previously unannounced batch of 60 ex-German Army vehicles for Operation Desert Storm. When in use by the US Army in the first Gulf War these were known by the XM93 designation. Due to downsizing of the US Army, the 210 vehicles to be purchased in Phases III and IV were not ordered. Under a number of contract awards from 1991 until around 2002, and through an interim XM931 designation, at least 128 vehicles were upgraded to M93A1 standard. From 2005, 31 vehicles were further upgraded in support of Operation Iraqi Freedom to M93A1P1 standard. To support operations in the Southwest Asia (SWA) region, an Urgent Material Requirement (UMR) was issued covering various upgrades to P2 standard for the M93A1P1. The exact number of M93 Fox NBCRS in service with the US Armed Forces is not clear. It is thought that the fleet comprised 122 vehicles, though the exact mix of M93A1, M93A1P1 and M93A1P2 variants is unknown. The previous mix, was 86 M93A1, 22 of the M93A1P1 and 14 M93A1P2, with upgrades from the earlier variants to the M93A1P2 standard ongoing. The M93 is expected to be replaced in US service by the Stryker NBCRV.
  10 Fuchs 1 were ordered and delivered in 1983. These vehicles did not have the standard NBC system installed but had 76 mm smoke grenade dischargers, an 8000 kg capacity winch, an air conditioning system and two roof-mounted weapon systems. To the rear of the engine compartment is a Rheinmetall Landsysteme one-person turret with an externally mounted 12.7 mm heavy machine gun while behind this and facing the rear is a 7.62 mm light machine gun. These vehicles have full amphibious capability. Venezuela has fitted the US 106 mm M40A1 recoilless rifle to the roof of several vehicles. In February 2021 it was reported that these vehicles would be repaired and updated.

Gallery

See also 
 Patria Pasi
 Rheinmetall MAN Military Vehicles YAK
 M1117
 VAB
 Tactica
 BOV M11
 BRDM-2
 WZ551
 Anoa
 Ratel
 Fahd

References

Bibliography 
 RMMV Fuchs 2 military brochure (2014)
 Rheinstahl Wehrtechnik Fuchs military sales literature (1980s)
 Jane's Armour & Artillery 2011/2012  Jane’s Land Warfare Platforms: Armoured Fighting Vehicles
 Tank Recognition Guide (Jane's) (Jane's Recognition Guide)

External links 

 RMMV

Amphibious armoured personnel carriers
Armoured fighting vehicles of the Cold War
Armoured personnel carriers of Germany
Armoured personnel carriers of the Cold War
Rheinmetall
Six-wheeled vehicles
Wheeled amphibious armoured fighting vehicles
Military vehicles introduced in the 1970s
Wheeled armoured personnel carriers